The Leo P. Lamoureax Memorial Trophy was awarded annually to the International Hockey League's leading point scorer.  The trophy was donated by Melvin T. Ross, the manager of the Indiana State Fair Coliseum, in memoriam of Leo Lamoureux, coach of the Indianapolis Chiefs, who died during the 1960–1961 season.

Prior to 1961, the top scorer award was known as the George H. Wilkinson Trophy, named after Lt.-Col., George H. Wilkinson, V.D., a Windsor, Ontario, jeweler and one of the league's original sponsors.

Winners

References
 Leo P. Lamoureux Memorial Trophy www.azhockey.com
 Leo P. Lamoureux Memorial Trophy www.hockeydb.com
 George H. Wilkinson Trophy www.hockeydb.com

International Hockey League (1945–2001) trophies